Statistics of Emperor's Cup in the 1982 season.

Overview
It was contested by 28 teams, and Yamaha Motors won the championship.

Results

1st round
Nippon Sport Science University 1–1 (PK 2–1) Morioka Zebra
Nippon Kokan 2–0 Yamaguchi Teachers
Osaka University of Commerce 1–2 Mazda
Furukawa Electric 3–1 Fukuoka University
Kyoto Sangyo University 0–4 Nippon Steel
Teijin 0–2 Matsushita Electric
Tanabe Pharmaceuticals 2–1 Daikyo Oil
Toshiba 1–2 Yamaha Motors
Fujitsu 4–3 Honda
Hitachi 3–1 Kokushikan University
Sapporo University 1–2 Nissan Motors
Nissei Plastic Industry 1–2 Tokyo University of Agriculture

2nd round
Fujita Industries 6–2 Nippon Sport Science University
Nippon Kokan 1–2 Mazda
Furukawa Electric 3–0 Nippon Steel
Matsushita Electric 2–4 Yanmar Diesel
Mitsubishi Motors 2–0 Tanabe Pharmaceuticals
Yamaha Motors 1–0 Fujitsu
Hitachi 3–1 Nissan Motors
Tokyo University of Agriculture 0–2 Yomiuri

Quarterfinals
Fujita Industries 3–0 Mazda
Furukawa Electric 0–0 (PK 2–3) Yanmar Diesel
Mitsubishi Motors 0–1 Yamaha Motors
Hitachi 0–1 Yomiuri

Semifinals
Fujita Industries 1–0 Yanmar Diesel
Yamaha Motors 2–0 Yomiuri

Final

Fujita Industries 0–1 Yamaha Motors
Yamaha Motors won the championship.

References
 NHK

Emperor's Cup
Emperor's Cup
1983 in Japanese football